Andrid is a commune situated in Satu Mare County, Romania. It is composed of three villages: Andrid, Dindești (Érdengeleg) and Irina (Iriny).

References

Communes in Satu Mare County